...Beyond My Grey wake is the debut studio album by the Italian gothic doom metal band How Like a Winter.

Track listing
 "A Flower That Sears in Silence" – 5:51
 "All the Seasons of Madness" – 7:58
 "Laying Together Again" – 6:52
 "Bescreen'd" – 10:37
 "Who is Hiding" (instrumental) – 2:20
 "Crucifige" – 7:09
 "XCVII" – 3:19
 "The Night, Then Him" – 8:23
 "So Death Would be Just a Bad Dream" (instrumental) – 7:01

 Music and arrangements by Dust, Mist and Bane. All lyrics written by Dust except track 7 written by William Shakespeare. The artwork on the album was created by Paul Kuhr of Novembers Doom.

Personnel 
 Dust − male vocals, piano, orchestra
 Agony − violins  	
 Tragedy − female vocals
 Misery − female vocals
 Bane − bass guitar
 Mist − classical, acoustic and electric guitars

References

How Like a Winter albums
2003 debut albums
Death-doom albums